George Cummings (21 September 1882 – 30 December 1943) was a New Zealand cricketer. He played first-class cricket for Otago and Auckland between 1902 and 1923.

Cummings was born at Dunedin in 1882 and was the older brother of Edwin Cummings who also played for Otago. He worked as a warehouseman.

References

External links
 

1882 births
1943 deaths
New Zealand cricketers
Auckland cricketers
Otago cricketers
Cricketers from Dunedin